Dionysius II was the Patriarch of Antioch and head of the Syriac Orthodox Church from 896/897 until his death in 908/909.

Biography
Dionysius studied and became a monk at the monastery of Beth Batin, near Harran in Upper Mesopotamia. He was chosen to succeed Theodosius Romanus as patriarch of Antioch in an election by lot, and was consecrated on 23 April 896/897 (AG 1208) by archbishop Jacob of Emesa at the village of Ashit, near Sarug, according to the histories of Michael the Syrian and Bar Hebraeus.

Soon after his ascension to the patriarchal office, Dionysius convened a synod at the monastery of Saint Shila, at which he issued twenty-five canons and was attended by thirty-five bishops. He served as patriarch of Antioch until his death on 18 April 908/909 (AG 1220) at the monastery of Beth Batin, where he was buried. As patriarch, Dionysius ordained fifty bishops, as per Michael the Syrian's Chronicle, whereas Bar Hebraeus in his Ecclesiastical History credits Dionysius with the ordination of fifty-one bishops.

Episcopal succession
As patriarch, Dionysius ordained the following bishops:

 Theodosius, archbishop of Edessa
 Iwannis, archbishop of Samosata
 Timothy, archbishop of Damascus
 John, bishop of Tribus
 Jacob, bishop of Irenopolis
 Ignatius, bishop of Qinnasrin
 John, bishop of Zuptara 
 John, bishop of Harran
 Daniel, archbishop of Samosata
 Cyriacus, bishop of Baalbek
 Gabriel, archbishop of Cyrrhus
 Isaac, archbishop of Herat
 Philoxenus, archbishop
 Dioscorus, archbishop of Edessa
 Habib, bishop of Irenopolis
 Samuel, archbishop of Maipherqat
 Abraham, archbishop of Aphrah
 Isaac, bishop of Nisibis
 John, bishop of Tur Abdin
 Job, bishop of Callisura
 Theodosius, bishop of Reshʿayna
 Cyril, archbishop of Tarsus
 Theophilus, bishop of Zuptara 
 Daniel, bishop of Armenia
 Gregory, archbishop of Raqqa
 Jacob, bishop of Abadqawau
 Abraham, bishop of Doula
 Cosmas, bishop of Hadath
 Peter, archbishop of Resafa
 Jacob, bishop of Tiberias
 Moses, bishop of Amid
 George, bishop of Hadath
 John, bishop of Marde
 Timothy, bishop of Circesium
 Anastasius, bishop of Abadqawan
 Athanasius, archbishop of Damascus
 Athanasius, archbishop of Tarsus
 Theodoretus, archbishop of Maipherqat
 Gabriel, archbishop of Apamea
 Isaac, bishop of Armenia
 Jacob, bishop of Doliche
 Elias, bishop of Melitene
 Ignatius, bishop of Irenopolis
 Iwannis, archbishop of Dara
 Ignatius, archbishop of Amid
 Isaac, bishop of Zeugma
 Timothy, bishop of Samosata
 Basil, bishop of Bithynia
 Timothy, archbishop of Edessa
 Joseph, bishop of Sarug

References
Notes

Citations

Bibliography

Syriac Patriarchs of Antioch from 512 to 1783
Year of birth unknown
9th-century Oriental Orthodox archbishops
900s deaths
9th-century births
Upper Mesopotamia under the Abbasid Caliphate
9th-century people from the Abbasid Caliphate
10th-century people from the Abbasid Caliphate
10th-century Oriental Orthodox archbishops